Leptothyra nanina is a species of small sea snail with calcareous opercula, a marine gastropod mollusk in the family Colloniidae.

Description
The shell reaches a height of 4 mm.
The minute, umbilicate shell is suborbicular. The apex is obtuse. The shell is spirally impressed-striate. The  apex, the subsutural tract and the base show impressed radiating striae. The color of the shell is white and marked around the periphery with rosy equally spaced spots. There are five, convex whorls. The aperture is rounded. The columella is thickened. The narrow umbilicus is deep, rounded, and radiately plicate on the edge.

Distribution
This marine species occurs in the Indo-West Pacific and off Australia and New Caledonia.

References

External links
 To USNM Invertebrate Zoology Mollusca Collection
 To World Register of Marine Species
 

Colloniidae
Gastropods described in 1864